Steinmetz College Prep (also known as Steinmetz High School or Steinmetz Academic Centre) is a public 4–year high school located in the Belmont Cragin community area on the Northwest Side of Chicago, Illinois. Steinmetz is a part of the Chicago Public Schools district. The school is named for the German-American mathematician and electrical engineer Charles Proteus Steinmetz. The school opened in 1934. Steinmetz is an International Baccalaureate (IB) Programme school. The school has an active Junior Reserve Officers' Training Corps (JROTC).

History
In 1995 the school had 2,237 students, with around equal numbers of black, Hispanic/Latino, and white students, making it the sixth-largest high school in Chicago.

In 2016, 22 Steinmetz students participated in the Kakehashi Cultural Exchange Program trip to Japan. The award-winning 2010 documentary Louder Than a Bomb (film) features the Steinmetz team competing in and winning the 2008 Louder Than a Bomb poetry slam. The 2000 television movie Cheaters is based on a 1995 Academic Decathlon scandal that involved the school. Parts of the movie  were filmed (without permission) at Steinmetz.

Athletics
Steinmetz competes in the Chicago Public League  and is a member of the Illinois High School Association (IHSA). Steinmetz sport teams are nicknamed the Silver Streaks. The boys' baseball team were Public League champions during the 1974 –75 season. The boys' cross country team were Public League champions in the 1949–50 and 1991–92 seasons.

Notable alumni
 Justin Anderson, college football player
 Lisa Boyle, photographer, model for Playboy
 Hannibal Buress, stand-up comedian, actor and television writer
 Nicholas Calabrese, the first made man ever to testify against the Chicago Outfit.
 Tony Canadeo, NFL football player
 Tiny Croft, NFL football player
 Frank Cullotta, mobster
 Ralph Frese, canoe maker and conservationist
 Bob Grant, radio broadcaster
 Robert E. Griswold, author
 Hugh Hefner, founder of Playboy Enterprises.
 Joanna Krupa, model
 Fred Marsh, MLB player
 Robert Muczynski, composer
 Lou Possehl, MLB player for the Philadelphia Phillies
 Chuck Schaden, broadcaster
 Danny Seraphine, musician; former drummer and founding member of the band Chicago   (attended)
 Anthony Spilotro, Chicago Italian-American mobster and enforcer
 Michael Spilotro, mobster (younger brother of Anthony Spilotro and Victor Spilotro)
 Victor Spilotro, mobster  (older brother of Michael and Anthony Spilotro)
 Ray Soden, state senator and national commander of the VFW

More notable alumni are featured each month on the Steinmetz Alumni Association website's Alumni Spotlight feature.

References

External links

School website
Steinmetz Alumni Association website
Hanson, Cynthia. "The Big Cheat." Chicago. September 1995. p. 74-77, 117-122.

Public high schools in Chicago